河南 is the Chinese name for Henan province in China.

河南 may also refer to:

 Hà Nam Province, Vietnam
 Henan Mongol Autonomous County, Qinghai, China
 Tuyuhun, also known as "Henan State" (河南国/河南國)
 Hanam, city in Gyeonggi-do, South Korea
 An informal name for Haizhu District, Guangzhou, China